Judge Dredd: The Megazine is a monthly British comic magazine, launched in September 1990. It is a sister publication to 2000 AD. Its name is a play on words, formed from "magazine" and Judge Dredd's locale Mega-City One.

Content

Like 2000 AD, Judge Dredd Megazine is an anthology, featuring both ongoing and stand-alone stories. Some series have comprised a specific storyline while others only a loose thematic connection. Originally the Megazine only set stories in the world of Judge Dredd, including both spin-off series and Future Shock-style done-in-one stories, starting with Strange Cases
and continuing with Tales from the Black Museum. It has since expanded to include some unconnected stories and text pieces, including articles, interviews and reviews.

Unlike 2000 AD, reprint material has been extensively used in order to bring costs down. As well as older 2000 AD stories such as Helltrekkers, there have also been reprints that originate elsewhere, such as Preacher and Charley's War. Since the demise of 2000 AD Extreme Edition, a bimonthly 2000 AD spinoff which focused on reprints of old strips, a separate reprint supplement has been packaged with each issue of the Megazine, usually focusing on the work of a particular 2000 AD contributor or compiling a particular strip.

Starting in issue #276 a creator-owned slot that featured Tank Girl, American Reaper and Snapshot has appeared.

Series
For a complete list of stories, see the External links section below.

Al's Baby
America
Armitage
The Bad Man
Black Atlantic
Black Siddha
Blood of Satanus
Brit-Cit Brute
Cal-Hab Justice
Citi-Def
Creep
Cursed Earth Koburn
Devlin Waugh
Dominion

Fiends of the Eastern Front
Harke and Burr
Hawk the Slayer
The Inspectre
Insurrection
Judge Dredd
Judge Hershey
Low Life
Missionary Man
Psi-Judge Anderson
Shimura
Sleeze 'n' Ryder
The Simping Detective
The Streets Of Dan Francisco
Tales From The Black Museum
Tempest
Young Middenface

Themed one-offs

Strange Cases
Tales from the Black Museum

Creator-owned
Al's Baby
American Reaper
Lily MacKenzie
Numbercruncher
Ordinary
Snapshot
Tank Girl

Reprints
From 2000AD:
Button Man #3.72-3.75
The Helltrekkers #218-223

From other publishers:
Preacher #3.40-3.63
Sin City #3.42–3.44
Charley's War #211-244
Bob The Galactic Bum #266-273

Supplements
Some issues are accompanied by supplements containing stories reprinted from earlier issues of the Megazine or from 2000AD. (A complete list is given below.)

Features

Text articles appear in between the stories. They are usually comic-related, such as biographies or obituaries,  interviews with writers and artists, or articles about stories, but they can also be about science-fiction, horror and fantasy television shows, book reviews and upcoming films.

A feature that ran from 2006 was "Small Press". This section dealt with small press or self-published writer/artists. It featured reviews of comics, and included one story every issue. They are usually unrelated to the Judge Dredd universe.

At the end of most issues is a letters section, called Dreddlines, where the readers can voice their opinions about the magazine.

Creators

Creators to have worked for Judge Dredd Megazine include:

Simon Bisley
Carlos Ezquerra
Alan Grant (also a consultant editor)
Trevor Hairsine
Chris Halls
Cam Kennedy
Pat Mills
Robbie Morrison
Arthur Ranson
Gordon Rennie
Si Spencer
Simon Spurrier
John Wagner (also a consultant editor)

Editors

Steve MacManus, 1990–1991 (issues 1.01 – 1.12)
David Bishop, 1991–1995 (1.13 – 3.12)
John Tomlinson, 1996 (3.16 – 3.21)
David Bishop, 1996–2000 (3.22 – 3.63)
Andy Diggle, 2000 (3.64 – 3.68)
David Bishop, 2000–2002 (3.69 – 4.08)
Alan Barnes, 2002–2006 (4.09 – 4.18, 201 – 240)
Matt Smith, 2006–present (241 – present)

(Note: 4.18 was the 200th issue. From the next issue a new numbering system was introduced, and the issue which would have been 4.19 became 201.)

Awards
 1992: won the UK Comic Art Award for Best Ongoing Publication
 1993: won the UK Comic Art Award for Best Ongoing Publication
 1999: nominated for the Eagle Award for Favourite British Comic
 2002: nominated for the Eagle Award for Favourite British Comic
 2000: nominated for the Eagle Award for Favourite British Comic
 2004: nominated for the Eagle Award for Favourite British Comic
 2005: nominated for the Eagle Award for Favourite Colour Comic Book - British
 2006: won the Eagle Award for Best British Colour Comic
 2007: nominated for the Eagle Award for Favourite Colour Comicbook - British
 2008: nominated for the Eagle Award for Favourite Colour Comicbook - British
 2012: nominated for the Eagle Award for Favourite Colour Comicbook — British

See also
2000 AD crossovers, of which the Megazine is the other major comic outlet of stories.

Notes

References

External links
Official 2000 AD Web site
2000 AD Review fan site

Lists of stories on WikiCommons
 
 
 

Comics magazines published in the United Kingdom
Magazines established in 1990
1990 comics debuts
Judge Dredd
Fleetway and IPC Comics titles
Rebellion Developments titles